David Foster OAM (born 20 March 1957) is an Australian world champion woodchopper, and Tasmanian community figure. He has held the World Woodchopping Championship title for 21 consecutive years, and is Australia's most successful athlete and possibly the only athlete in any sport in the world to win over 1000 titles.

Personal life
Foster is married to Jan Foster and has four children. Following his wife's illness, he was forced to quit management of the Australian Axeman's Hall of Fame at Latrobe. In 2014 he announced plans to leave Tasmania following an offer by Camden Council to set up a multimillion-dollar tourist attraction focused on his memorabilia after Tasmanian businesses and government rejected proposals for a similar attraction in Tasmania. However, he remained in Tasmania after being signed as the spokesman for OneCare, a Tasmanian aged care provider.

Athletic career
He started woodchopping with his father, George Foster, in 1978, and between them they won the World 600 mm Double-handed Sawing Championship eleven years straight. He and his brother Peter Foster continued competing and winning this event for another ten years, until 1999, making David a world champion 21 years straight. The pair lost in 2000, but re-gained the championship in 2001, after which David's son Stephen took over as his woodchopping partner.

His other achievements in wood chopping include winning the Australian Axeman of the Year award nine times in a row, winning every major wood chopping event in Australia and New Zealand, becoming the first person in sporting history to have won 1000 championships, and being the only axeman to have ever won six out of seven championships at the Sydney Royal Easter Show.

The Australian Axeman's Hall of Fame in Latrobe, Tasmania, was operated by David Foster and his wife Jan from 2004 until 2006.

Other activities
David Foster is often joined in his charitable quests by Launceston cricketer David Boon. Both Foster and Boon, as well as then-Premier of Tasmania Jim Bacon, also willingly allowed their famous moustaches to be shaved off for charity.

Foster has written a book called The Power Of Two. He is a campaigner for LGBT rights following his daughter coming out to him.

Honours
Foster has received several awards for his cultural, charitable and community activities. These include being awarded an Order of Australia Medal, a commendation from the then Governor of Tasmania Sir Phillip Bennett, and an Anzac Medal for services to the community. He also received a Tasmanian of the Year award in 1995, and was appointed a Director of the National Australia Day Council in 1998. In 2020, inducted into Sport Australia Hall of Fame.

References

External links
David Foster's official site

1957 births
Living people
Australian woodchoppers
Recipients of the Medal of the Order of Australia
People from Devonport, Tasmania
Sport Australia Hall of Fame inductees
Australian LGBT rights activists
Culture of Tasmania